Abd al-Hamid ibn Ahmad ibn Abd al-Samad Shirazi, better known as Abd al-Hamid Shirazi (عبدالحمید شیرازی), was a Persian vizier of the Ghaznavid Sultan Ibrahim and the latter's son Mas'ud III.

Biography 
He was the son of the prominent Ghaznavid vizier Ahmad Shirazi, who was the son of Abu Tahir Shirazi, a secretary under the Samanids, whose family was originally from Shiraz in southern Iran. In 1077/8, Abd al-Hamid was appointed by Sultan Ibrahim as his vizier, and after the latter's death in 1099, continued to serve as vizier under his son Mas'ud III until 1114/5. After a brief dynastic struggle between some Ghaznavid princes, a son of Mas'ud III, Arslan-Shah, emerged victorious and became the new ruler of the Ghaznavid Empire. However, Arslan-Shah's reign turned out short; his mother, a Seljuq princess named Gawhar Khatun was treated badly, which resulted in her brother Ahmad Sanjar to invade Arslan-Shah's domains, where he managed to decisively defeat Arslan-Shah and make the latter's brother Bahram-Shah the new ruler of the Ghaznavid dynasty, while at the same time acknowledging Sejluq suzerainty. Abd al-Hamid, who was a supporter of Arslan-Shah, was probably killed during this struggle.

Abd al-Hamid had a son named Muhammad, who in turn had a son named Abu'l-Ma'ali Nasrallah, who became prominent at the Ghaznavid court as an excellent poet and statesman, and eventually became the vizier of Sultan Khusrau Malik.

References

Sources 
 
 
 
 

11th-century births
1118 deaths
Year of birth unknown
11th-century Iranian people
12th-century Iranian people
Ghaznavid viziers
People from Shiraz